Song for Juli is the fourth solo album by singer-songwriter and former Youngblood Jesse Colin Young. The album had a higher chart placing than any of the Youngbloods albums, and stayed on the charts longer than any other album he ever made.

Several of the songs include allusions to Young's ridgetop home in Inverness, California on Drake View Drive. The house burned down in the 1995 Mount Vision Fire.

Track listing
"Mornin' Sun"  (J.C. Young) – 4:04
"Song for Juli"  (J.C. Young, Suzi Young) – 4:59
"Ridgetop"  (J.C. Young) – 7:02
"Evenin'"  (J.C. Young) – 3:13
"Miss Hesitation"  (J.C. Young) – 6:26
"T-Bone Shuffle"  (T-Bone Walker) – 5:03
"Lafayette Waltz"  (Clifton Chenier) – 1:45
"Jambalaya"  (Hank Williams) – 3:18
"Country Home"  (J.C. Young) – 4:04

Personnel
Jesse Colin Young – guitar, vocals
Suzi Young – harmony vocals
David Hayes – bass, harmony vocals
Eddy Ottenstein – guitar
Jeff Myer – drums
Scott Lawrence – piano, vibraphone
Rick Anderson – harmonica
John Tenney – violin
Jim Rothermel – clarinet, saxophone
Bob Ferreira – saxophone
Mel Martin – saxophone
Tom Harrell – trumpet
Gordon Messick – trombone
Pat O'Hara – trombone
Earthquake – harmonica

Production
Producer: Jesse Colin Young
Recording Engineer: Jesse Colin Young, Suzi Young, Bob Ferreira, Tom Harrell, David Hayes, Scott Lawrence, Mel Martin, Gordon Messick, Jim Rothermel, John Tenney
Mastering: John Cuniberti, Ethan Turner
Art Design: Sidney Wasserbach
Photography: Jon Sievert, Sidney Wasserbach
Liner Notes: Unknown

References

Jesse Colin Young albums
1973 albums
Albums produced by Jesse Colin Young
Warner Records albums